Furkan Oruç (born 18 December 1996) is a Turkish male compound archer and part of the national team.

Private life
Furkan Oruç was born in Yalova, Turkey on 18 December 1996.

Sport career
Oruç is a member of  Yalova Gençlik Hizmetleri Sports Club, where he is coached by Efrahim Canfes.

In 2016, he was admitted to Turkey national team. Oruç won the gold medal together with his teammates in the second leg of the 2021 Archery World Cup in Lausanne, Switzerland. Hetook the gold medal in the team event of the 2021 European Archery Championships held in Antalya, Turkey.

He won the silver medal in the men's team compound event at the 2022 European Indoor Archery Championships held in Laško, Slovenia.

He won the silver medal in the men's team compound event at the Laško, Slovenia event in the 2022 European Indoor Archery Championships.

References

1996 births
Living people
Sportspeople from Yalova
Turkish male archers
21st-century Turkish people